This is a list of Spanish television related events in 2009.

Events 
 8 April: The Government of Spain gives the green light to pay-pre-view Digital terrestrial television.
 18 May: TV Channel La Siete starts broadcasting.
 5 June: PRISA and Mediapro signa n agreement about broadcasting rights of La Liga football matches.
 29 July: The Senate of Spain passes the New TVE Financing Act, forbiding Advertisement in the public television.
 24 November: Alberto Oliart is appointed President of RTVE.
 18 December: Telecinco and Cuatro merge in a new group with 81,7% share of the first and 18'3% for PRISA.

Debuts

Television shows

Ending this year

Changes of network affiliation

Deaths 
 30 January - Fernando Cebrián, 79, actor.
 1 March - Pepe Rubianes, 61, actor & comedian.
 18 April - Fernando Hilbeck, 75, actor.
 3 May - Pablo Lizcano, 58, host.
 24 May - Pedro Sempson, 89, actor.
 15 June - Fernando Delgado, 79, actor.
 26 June - Conchita Núñez, 66, voice actress.
 31 July - Mary Carrillo, 89, actress.
 4 August - Julián Lago, 62, journalist & host.
 6 August - Lola Lemos, 96, actress.
 11 August - Valerio Lazarov, 73, director & producer.
 6 September - Julio de Benito, 62, journalist.
 16 October - Andrés Montes, 53, journalist
 2 November - José Luis López Vázquez, 87, actor.
 6 December -Pedro Altares, 74, journalist.
 11 December - Francisco Piquer, 87, actor.

See also
 2009 in Spain
 List of Spanish films of 2009

References 

2009 in Spanish television